, better known by his stage name , is a Japanese actor known for playing the hero Takeshi Hongo in the tokusatsu superhero series Kamen Rider, and later the Sega Saturn mascot Segata Sanshiro (jokingly revealed to be Takeshi Hongo himself). Fujioka is a cultural icon in Japan, even having the minor planet 12408 Fujioka, discovered by Akimasa Nakamura, named in his honor. Fujioka writes his name with the ideographic comma at the end (after the kanji for ), saying "It is meant to remind me to reconsider myself and what it is that I need to achieve. It shows that I am not yet finished with my tasks and must continue working toward their accomplishment."

Hiroshi's son, Maito, serves as the current ambassador of Sega as of March 26, 2020, portraying as Segata Sanshiro's son Sega Shiro, as well as Takeshi Hongo's younger-self as of 2021, starting from Kamen Rider: Beyond Generations.

Filmography

Live-action

 Takeshi Hongo/Kamen Rider 1
Kamen Rider (1971-1973) (episodes 1-10, 40-41, 49, 51-65, 68-98)
Kamen Rider Vs. Shocker (1972) - Movie
Kamen Rider Vs. Hell Ambassador (1972) - Movie
Kamen Rider V3 (1973) (episodes 1, 2, 21, 33, 34)
Kamen Rider V3 Vs. Destron Mutants (1973) - Movie (Voice)
Kamen Rider X: Five Riders Vs. King Dark (1974) - Movie (Voice)
Kamen Rider Stronger (1975) (episodes 38, 39)
All Together! Seven Kamen Riders!! (1976) - Special
OOO, Den-O, All Riders: Let's Go Kamen Riders (2011) - Movie (voice)
Heisei Riders vs. Shōwa Riders: Kamen Rider Taisen feat. Super Sentai (2014) - Movie
Kamen Rider 1 (2016) - Movie (also writer alongside Toshiki Inoue)
Saber + Zenkaiger: Super Hero Senki (2021) - Movie
 Taiga drama
Katsu Kaishū (1974) as Sakamoto Ryōma
Kusa Moeru (1979) as Miura Yoshimura
Onna Taikoki (1981) as Oda Nobunaga
Haru no Hato (1985) as Okuhira Takeshi
Kasuga no Tsubone (1989) as Oda Nobunaga
Hana no Ran (1994) as Ōuchi Masahiro
Sanada Maru (2016) as Honda Tadakatsu
What Will You Do, Ieyasu? (2023) as Oda Nobuhide
 Submersion of Japan (1973) as Onodera Toshio
 Ginji the Speculator (2022)

Video games
 Kamen Rider: Battride War Genesis (2016) as Takeshi Hongo/Kamen Rider 1
 Project X Zone 2 (2015) as Segata Sanshiro

References

External links
 Samurai-Hiroshi.com - Official website 

 
 

1946 births
Living people
Actors from Ehime Prefecture
Male voice actors from Ehime Prefecture
Japanese male film actors
Japanese male television actors
Japanese male video game actors
Japanese male voice actors
20th-century Japanese male actors
21st-century Japanese male actors